Golden Heart is the debut solo studio album by British singer-songwriter and guitarist Mark Knopfler.

Golden Heart may also refer to:

Order of the Golden Heart of Kenya
Order of the Golden Heart, Philippines
Golden Heart, Spitalfields, London, UK
Golden Heart award
Golden Heart Tour
Golden Heart trigger, a fish
Golden Heart Farm, New York, USA